Jack Crawford Taylor (April 14, 1922 – July 2, 2016) was an American businessman and billionaire who founded the Enterprise Rent-A-Car Company. Taylor also was a fighter pilot for the United States Navy during World War II.

Early life and education
Taylor was the elder of two sons born in St. Louis, Missouri, to Melburne Martling Taylor and Dorothy Crawford Taylor. Taylor enrolled in the Olin Business School at Washington University in St. Louis in 1940. He left school to join the U.S. Navy.

Career
After the war, he returned to St. Louis and started a delivery service company. In 1948, he took a job at the Lindburg Cadillac dealership where he eventually became a sales manager. In 1957, he started a car leasing business at the dealership in partnership with his employer, Arthur R. Lindburg, which required that he take a 50 percent pay cut and put up $25,000 for a 25% interest in the business. Targeting people whose cars were in the shop, the Executive Leasing Company began operation with a total of seven cars.

In 1969, Taylor expanded outside St. Louis and changed the name of the company to Enterprise, after the USS Enterprise aircraft carrier upon which he had served in World War II. Unlike his competitors, who focused on business rentals at airports, Taylor concentrated on the hometown market offering home pickup services which led to Enterprise's "We'll Pick You Up" slogan. By 1980, the rental fleet had grown to 6,000 cars. In 1989, the fleet had grown to 50,000 and he changed the name of the company to Enterprise Rent-A-Car. By 1992, Enterprise surpassed $1 billion in revenues and by 1995, it reached $2 billion in revenues. In 2007, Enterprise purchased National Car Rental and Alamo Rent-A-Car. The current executive chairman is Taylor's son, Andrew C. Taylor.

Taylor's business credo was: "Take care of your customers and employees first, and profits will follow.
His grand daughter, Chrissy Taylor, is now the CEO of the company. He has led a great company and established a family company with a family legacy. "

Philanthropy 
$40 million challenge gift to the St. Louis Symphony Orchestra 
$30 million gift to the Missouri Botanical Garden to fund global plant research (largest ever gift given to a U.S. botanical garden) 
$25 million to establish the Enterprise Rent-A-Car Scholars Program at Washington University in St. Louis to support scholarships for minority and financially disadvantaged students
$1 million gift to Ranken Technical College located in St. Louis
$22 million in gifts to 10 charitable and educational organizations supporting underserved children in the St. Louis area
$92.5 million in donations to 13 cultural institutions and charities, mostly in the St. Louis area

Personal life
Taylor was married and divorced twice. In 1945, Taylor married the former Mary Ann MacCarthy, and the couple had two children: Andrew C. Taylor, who is the executive chairman of Enterprise, and Jo Ann Taylor, who runs the Taylor family philanthropic activities. Taylor and his first wife divorced in 1977 after a long separation, and in 1979, he married Susan Orrison. Taylor and Orrison divorced in 2000. In 1978, Taylor's first wife married E. Desmond Lee, a widower and a prominent businessman and philanthropist in his own right. He died on July 2, 2016 in St. Louis at the age of 94.

Honors 
The Jack C. Taylor Conference Center which is under construction at the United States Naval Institute in Annapolis is named in recognition of his career as a U.S. Navy fighter pilot as well as his contributions as an entrepreneur, business leader, and philanthropist.

References

External links 
Forbes.com: Forbes 400 Richest Americans (2006)
Fortune.com: How father & son built a company known for excellent customer service
Washington University in St. Louis Magazine: A Man on a Mission

1922 births
2016 deaths
American billionaires
Businesspeople from St. Louis
United States Navy officers
United States Naval Aviators
United States Navy pilots of World War II
Olin Business School (Washington University) alumni
Recipients of the Air Medal
Recipients of the Distinguished Flying Cross (United States)
Missouri Botanical Garden people
Enterprise Holdings
Philanthropists from Missouri
20th-century American businesspeople
21st-century American businesspeople
20th-century American philanthropists
21st-century philanthropists
Washington University in St. Louis people